Giuseppe Palma (born 20 January 1994) is an Italian footballer. He plays for Cavese.

Club career
On 19 July 2018, Palma signed with Serie C club Rieti.

On 12 December 2019 he agreed to join Serie D club Turris.

On 31 July 2021 he signed with Cavese in Serie D.

National team
Palma has one cap for the Italy U19 team.

References

External links

Profile in Lithuanian A lyga

1994 births
Footballers from Naples
Living people
Italian footballers
Association football midfielders
S.S.C. Napoli players
L.R. Vicenza players
Paganese Calcio 1926 players
FK Kauno Žalgiris players
S.S. Ischia Isolaverde players
FC Chiasso players
Mantova 1911 players
F.C. Rieti players
S.S.D. F.C. Messina players
Cavese 1919 players
Serie B players
Serie C players
Serie D players
A Lyga players
Swiss Challenge League players
Italian expatriate footballers
Expatriate footballers in Lithuania
Expatriate footballers in Switzerland